Matern is a surname. Notable people with the surname include:

Anik Matern, Canadian actress
Max Matern (1902–1935), German communist
Bertil Matérn, (1917 – 2007), Swedish statistician

See also
Matern von Marschall